A Wolf at the Table is a 2008 memoir by Augusten Burroughs that recounts his turbulent childhood relationship with his father. In an interview with Wikinews, Burroughs said that many of his fans may have trouble with the book. A Wolf at the Table spent six weeks on the New York Times Best Seller list, reaching number 2 in its first week. It also reached number 9 on the Wall Street Journal's Best Seller List.

Tegan Quin of the duo Tegan and Sara wrote a song titled "His Love," which was performed at various book openings and occasionally at the Quin twin's concerts.

References

External links
 
 New York Times review

2008 non-fiction books
American autobiographies
LGBT literature in the United States
Books with cover art by Chip Kidd